Cheshmeh-ye Allahverdi (also Romanized as Cheshmeh-ye Allāhverdī; also known as Cheshmeh and Cheshmeh Khānverdī) is a village in Siyavashan Rural District, in the Central District of Ashtian County, Markazi Province, Iran. At the 2015 census, its population was 972, in 356 families.

References 

Populated places in Ashtian County